James Sharp (18 November 1843 – 7 May 1904) was the sixth mayor of Salt Lake City, serving from 1884 to 1886. For several years, Sharp was also a member of the University of Utah board of regents.  He was that university's chancellor from 1882 to 1883.

Early life and career
Sharp was born in Falkirk, Stirlingshire, Scotland on 18 November 1843. He was the son of John Sharp, a leader in the Church of Jesus Christ of Latter-day Saints who was also a director of the Union Pacific Railroad. Sharp came to America in 1848 settling in St. Louis. In 1850 he journeyed to Salt Lake City. In 1862, he served under the command of Lot Smith during the Utah War.  Sharp succeeded as director of Union Pacific Railroad after his father. In 1876, he was elected to the Utah territorial legislature and was the speaker of the House of Representatives from 1884 to 1886. Sharp was elected as mayor in 1884 and served until 1886.

References

Mayors of Salt Lake City
American Latter Day Saints
19th-century American politicians
University of Utah people
People of Utah Territory
1843 births
1904 deaths
Scottish emigrants to the United States
Members of the Utah Territorial Legislature